Carl August Wilhelm Berends (19 April 1759 – 1 December 1826) was a German physician born in Anklam, Pomerania.

He studied medicine at Viadrina University in Frankfurt an der Oder, where in 1788 he became a professor of medicine. In 1811, he moved to the University of Breslau, being due to the closure of Viadrina University in Frankfurt, and resulting in the relocation of much of its faculty to Breslau. In 1815, he was appointed professor of medicine at the University of Berlin and hospital director at the Berlin Charité.

In 1789, Berends published Über den Unterricht junger Ärzte am Krankenbett (Education of Young Physicians at the Bedside), in which he described his experiences at the Thielschen Krankenhaus in Frankfurt. Shortly after his death in 1826, his one-time student, Karl Sundelin, published Berends' lectures on practical medical science ("Vorlesungen über die praktische Arzneiwissenschaft").

References 
 Parts of this article are based on a translation of an article from the German Wikipedia, source listed as: ADB:Berends, Karl August Wilhelm In: Allgemeine Deutsche Biographie; Volume 2, Duncker & Humblot, Leipzig 1875 S. 356.
 Zeno.org translated biography @ Pierers Universal-Lexikon

1759 births
1826 deaths
People from Anklam
18th-century German physicians
People from the Province of Pomerania
Academic staff of European University Viadrina
Academic staff of the University of Breslau
Academic staff of the Humboldt University of Berlin
Physicians of the Charité